Gustavo Alex Mueller (born 23 March 2000), commonly known as Gustavo Alemão, is a Brazilian footballer who plays as a defender for Sharjah.

Career statistics

Club

References

2000 births
Living people
Brazilian footballers
Brazilian expatriate footballers
Association football defenders
Ituano FC players
CR Flamengo footballers
Sharjah FC players
Brazilian expatriate sportspeople in the United Arab Emirates
Expatriate footballers in the United Arab Emirates